Gapan, officially the City of Gapan (Ilocano: Siudad ti Gapan), is a 4th class component city in the province of Nueva Ecija, Philippines. According to the 2020 census, it has a population of 122,968 people.

Gapan is nicknamed the "Footwear Capital of the North" due to the thriving footwear making industry in the city.

History
Old records called the town Ibon. Gapan was founded by the Spanish curates and officials who, in their early occupation, exercised great influence over the people and the things they were doing. History places Gapan as one of the first towns of Pampanga founded sometime in the middle part of the sixteenth century. Records of the first Catholic mission to the far east indicated that in 1595, Fathers Contres Tendilla, Caballo and Salazar were responsible for clearing the forest which later became a pueblo. In this pueblo, a church, presedencia and residential houses made of bricks and lime were constructed, now the age-old landmarks of the city.

Its foundation in 1595 makes Gapan the oldest town in Nueva Ecija and one of the oldest in the Philippines. It was likewise a big pueblo embracing an area as far as Cabanatuan in the north, which was its barrio with the name Cabanatuan before it separated in 1750: the Sierra Madres in the East, San Miguel, Bulacan in the south and Candaba, Pampanga in the West. Gradually as the Spanish power waned and economic progress caught up in the area, the pueblo disintegrated into many pueblos until it remained to comprise only the towns of Peñaranda, General Tinio and San Leonardo (formerly called Manikling) all of Nueva Ecija province. In fact the Patron Saint Divina Pastora had its origin or residence in Barrio Callos, Peñaranda.

Cityhood

By virtue of Republic Act No. 9022 and its ratification in a plebiscite subsequently held on August 25, 2001, Gapan was converted into a component city of Nueva Ecija. Ernesto L. Natividad became the first city mayor of Gapan.

Geography
Gapan is located in the southern part of the province. It is bounded to the north by Peñaranda and San Leonardo, to the east by the Gen. Tinio, to the south by San Miguel in neighboring Bulacan province, and to the west by San Isidro.

Climate

Barangays
Gapan is politically subdivided into 23 barangays.

Demographics

Economy 

Current major sources of income include farming, slipper making, fishponds, poultry and piggery, and commercial establishments.

The city of Gapan held tremendous promise not only in its natural resources but also in its potentials in agri-base industries and in footwear industries which help sustain its virtual role in agricultural and industrial production. Commercial and trade activities in the city are further accelerated by the influx of financing lending institution and new businesses.

Like its sister city, Cabanatuan, Gapan also houses major shopping hubs in the province. The two major Philippine mall chains, Walter Mart and Robinsons Malls, has already established its presence in the city. Currently, major shopping centers in the city include: Walter Mart Gapan; Robinsons Gapan, Primark Town Center Gapan, RCS Gapan, and AllHome Gapan. Gapan has also several local grocery, department, and hardware stores.

Transportation 
Gapan serves many bus companies operating provincial and regional routes. Jeepney operators serve routes within the province with some reaching as far to nearby towns in Nueva Ecija. Much of the city's population rely on public transportation such as tricycles and jeeps to get around the city.

Two main highways serve the city of Gapan: Maharlika Highway and Jose Abad Santos Avenue. Maharlika Highway (or Pan-Philippine Highway) is the main highway traversing the city where most vehicles going to Cagayan Valley pass through. It links Gapan to its nearby city of Cabanatuan and town of San Miguel in the province of Bulacan. It also allows travelers to reach towns of Sta. Rosa and San Leonardo. On the other hand, Jose Abad Santos Avenue is the highway that links Gapan to the towns of San Isidro and Cabiao, where the road continues straightforward, again turning westward then eastward, entering Pampanga, and passes through Pampanga River.

One proposed expressway will pass through Gapan if built: it would be the North Luzon East Expressway (Quezon City to Cabanatuan).

Tourism

National Shrine of La Virgen Divina Pastora The center of Marian pilgrimages during the months of April and May is the National Shrine of Virgen La Divina Pastora as declared by the Catholic Bishops Conference in 1986. Little Vigan, Gapan.

Education
 Divina Pastora College
 Asian Institute of E-commerce (AIE) - Gapan Campus
 Gapan Computer Technical Institute
 ACLC College (Gapan Campus)
 Allen Institute of Technology
 College for Research and Technology
 Gapan City College formerly Nueva Ecija University of Science and Technology – Gapan Academic Extension Campus
 Gapan City Technical School
 Provincial Manpower Training Center (Technical School)
 SKD Academy Gapan Campus

Healthcare
Good Samaritan General Hospital - a private hospital located at Don Simeon St, Gapan.
Gapan District Hospital - a public hospital located at Divina Pastora Street, Divina Pastora Subdivision, Gapan.
Dr. J.P. Cruz Cancer Clinic
other clinics (dental, skin, etc.)

Notable people

Mariano Llanera, the Revolutionary General of the battle Cry of Nueva Ecija in Cabiao, Nueva Ecija.
General Pantaleon Valmonte, the capitan municipal of Gapan who, together with General Mariano Llanera, capitan municipal of Cabiao, launched the "First Cry of Nueva Ecija" against the Spanish rule on September 2, 1896.
Juan Liwag - former Senator of the Philippines
Nida Blanca - award-winning actress
Ryza Cenon - actress
Eula Valdez - actress
Joe Taruc - DZRH news anchor
Frankie Evangelista Former TV Patrol News Anchor
Coleen Perez - actress
 Daniel Figueroa - actor
 Deo Macalma - Radio and Television Anchor MBC and DZRH

Sister cities
 Cabanatuan, Nueva Ecija
 Cabiao, Nueva Ecija

Images

References

External links

 Gapan Official Website
 [ Philippine Standard Geographic Code]
 Philippine Census Information
 Local Governance Performance Management System

Cities in Nueva Ecija
Populated places established in 1732
1732 establishments in the Philippines
Component cities in the Philippines